Quality may refer to:

Concepts
Quality (business), the non-inferiority or superiority of something
Quality (philosophy), an attribute or a property
Quality (physics), in response theory
Energy quality, used in various science disciplines
Logical quality, philosophical categorization of statements
Service quality, comparison of expectations with performance in a service
Vapor quality, in thermodynamics, the ratio of mass of vapor to that of vapor and liquid
Data quality, refers to the condition of a set of values of qualitative or quantitative variables

Practices
Quality assurance (QA)
Quality control (QC)

Places
Quality, Kentucky, an unincorporated community

Brands and enterprises
Quality Comics, an American comic book publisher between 1939 and 1956
Quality Communications, a comic book publisher started in 1982
Quality Records, a Canadian entertainment company

Music
Quality (CDQ album), 2016
Quality (Talib Kweli album), 2002
"Quality", a song by Khalil from Prove It All, 2017
"Quality", a song by Maluma from Papi Juancho, 2020
Tone quality refers primarily to timbre; quality can also refer to:
Dynamics (music), every aspect of the execution of a given piece
Texture (music), the way the melodic, rhythmic, and harmonic materials are combined in a composition

Other

 The qualities, short for the Quality press (prestigious newspapers) in the U.K.